Gatuna town is a town in northern Rwanda. It is a border town that sits across from the town of Katuna, in neighboring Uganda.

Overview
Gatuna is the busiest border crossing in Rwanda. It handles most of Rwanda's imports and exports, since most Rwandan imports and exports via the coast pass through Uganda. Due to increasing commercial and tourist traffic, Gatuna is a fast-growing town. The border at Gatuna and Katuna is open 24 hours a day.

Location
Gatuna is located in Gicumbi District, Northern Province, at the border with the Republic of Uganda.

Population
The population of Gatuna is around 41,000 people

Points of interest
The following points of interest lie within the town limits or close to the edges of town:

 Offices of Gatuna Town Council
 Gatuna Central Market
 The International Border Crossing between Rwanda and Uganda - The border crossing is open 24 hours daily.
 A branch of the Bank of Kigali

See also
 Katuna
 Burera District
 Northern Province, Rwanda
 Katuna
 Bank of Kigali

References

Burera District
Northern Province, Rwanda
Populated places in Rwanda
Rwanda–Uganda border crossings